The women's team badminton event at the 2014 Asian Games in Incheon took place from 20 to 22 September 2014 at Gyeyang Gymnasium.

A total of 12 teams entered the event. The teams were drawn into a knock out bracket on 21 August 2014 at the Asian Games draw ceremony.

The final of the 2014 Incheon Asian Games on 22 September was a repeat of the 2002 Busan Asian Games, with the South Korea women's team meeting China. In the end, China won the gold medal after beating South Korea in the final, Japan and India finished 3rd and won the bronze medal. China had to beat Japan three wins to one while South Korea beat India with the same score in another semifinal.

Schedule
All times are Korea Standard Time (UTC+09:00)

Results

Round of 16

Quarterfinals

Semifinals

Gold medal match

Non-participating athletes

References

Results

External links
Official website

Badminton at the 2014 Asian Games